The Algarrobal El Moro Reserved Zone is a protected area in Peru. Its purpose is to protect the natural forests of carobs and their associated fauna, as well as the archaeological sites of the cultures Chimú and Moche.

Reserved zones of Peru